Alcubierre is a municipality located in the province of Huesca, Aragon, Spain. According to the 2004 census (INE), the municipality has a population of 439 inhabitants.

This town gives its name to the Sierra de Alcubierre (highest point 822 m) that rises in the west, about 3 km away.

References

External links and further reading
Chapter 2 Homage to Catalonia by George Orwell (archived link)

Municipalities in the Province of Huesca